2006 Magny-Cours GP2 Series round was a GP2 Series motor race held on 15 and 16 July, 2006 at the Circuit de Nevers Magny-Cours in Magny-Cours, France. It was the seventh race of the 2006 GP2 Series season. The race was used to support the 2006 French Grand Prix.

Classification

Qualifying

Feature race

Sprint race

Notes

References

Magny-Cours Gp2 Round, 2006
Magny-Cours
Magny-Cours GP2 Series round